Maksym Drachenko (born 28 January 1990) is a professional Ukrainian football midfielder for FC Okzhetpes.

He is a product of the FC Slavutych Cherkasy and FC Shakhtar Donetsk sportive schools. Drachenko's first trainer was Serhiy Kovalevych. After some seasons in the Ukrainian Second League club FC Shakhtar-3 Donetsk, he signed a contract with FC Olimpik in the Ukrainian First League. Maksym is married with one daughter.

References

External links
 
 

1990 births
Living people
Ukrainian footballers
Ukrainian expatriate footballers
Sportspeople from Cherkasy
Association football midfielders
FC Shakhtar-3 Donetsk players
FC Olimpik Donetsk players
FC Zirka Kropyvnytskyi players
FC Kyzylzhar players
FC Okzhetpes players
Ukrainian Premier League players
Ukrainian First League players
Ukrainian Second League players
Expatriate footballers in Kazakhstan
Ukrainian expatriate sportspeople in Kazakhstan